Sandgate is an electoral division in the state of Queensland, Australia.

It is located in the northern suburbs of Brisbane, covering Sandgate, Shorncliffe, Deagon, Brighton, Bracken Ridge, Fitzgibbon and Taigum. The whole electorate is located within the local government area of the City of Brisbane.

Sandgate is held by Stirling Hinchliffe of the Labor Party. The seat was held by former Labor leader Nev Warburton and former health minister Gordon Nuttall.

Members for Sandgate

Election results

References

External links
 

Sandgate